Magnhild Holmberg (12 March 1943 – 27 August 2013) was a Norwegian politician for the Progress Party.

She served as a deputy representative to the Parliament of Norway from Telemark during the terms 1993–1997 and 2005–2009. In total she met during 61 days of parliamentary session. She was also a Skien local politician. She died in August 2013 after a long battle with cancer.

References

1943 births
2013 deaths
Politicians from Skien
Progress Party (Norway) politicians
Deputy members of the Storting
Women members of the Storting
Deaths from cancer in Norway